Gilles Le Gendre (born 13 May 1958) is a French politician who presided over the La République En Marche group in the National Assembly from 2018 to 2020. He was elected to the National Assembly in the 2017 legislative election in the 2nd constituency of Paris, which encompasses the 5th, as well as parts of the 6th and 7th arrondissements.

Private career
A graduate of Sciences Po, Le Gendre worked as director of the Challenges magazine redaction from 1995 to 2001 after stints at Europe 1 and Le Nouvel Économiste. He was director of communications and member of the executive committee at Fnac from 2002 to 2004.

Political career
In Parliament, Le Gendre also serves as member of the Committee on National Defence and the Armed Forces. He was elected president of the LREM group in the National Assembly after the election of Richard Ferrand as the body's president. In July 2019, Le Gendre voted in favour of the French ratification of the European Union’s Comprehensive Economic and Trade Agreement (CETA) with Canada. He stepped down in 2020 as group president and was succeeded by former Interior Minister Christophe Castaner.

See also
 2017 French legislative election

References

1958 births
Living people
Lycée Pasteur (Neuilly-sur-Seine) alumni
Sciences Po alumni
Deputies of the 15th National Assembly of the French Fifth Republic
Deputies of the 16th National Assembly of the French Fifth Republic
Members of Parliament for Paris
La République En Marche! politicians
People from Neuilly-sur-Seine